Greg Pickersgill, born in Haverfordwest, Wales in 1951, is a British science fiction fan. He lived in London between 1971 and 1992, then returned to Haverfordwest.

Pickersgill's love of science fiction led him into UK fandom where his influence has been substantial, spanning fan-writing and convention-running. He joined the BSFA in 1967, a week too late for that year's only convention. His fanzines include Fouler, Ritblat, Stop Breaking Down, and Rastus Johnson's Cakewalk. Convention activities include developing British fanrooms in the 1970s, fanrooms at the 1987 and 1995 Worldcons and the 2000 Eastercon, and a key role in the Mexicons of the 1980s. He created the Memory Hole (a combined permanent fanzine collection and redistribution system), the former Memory Hole internet forum (for discussing reading, collecting and archiving science fiction fanzines) and helped set up The Mexicon Hat (a charitable fund to assist projects related to British fandom; beneficiaries included the journal Critical Wave).

A collection of Pickersgill's writing for fanzines, Can't Get Off the Island, was published to coincide with his guest appearance at the 2005 World Science Fiction Convention, Interaction.

His other interests include British jazz and military helmets.

Awards and honours
Doc Weir Award (1978)
TransAtlantic Fan Fund winner (1986)
Fan GoH: Follycon (Eastercon, 1988)
Nova Award for Fanzine and Fanwriter (1994)
GoH: Interaction (Worldcon 2005)

External links
Information on Greg, Memory Hole and other interests
Fanzine Bibliography
Fan Gallery Bio
TAFF result
Greg's GoH article in Follycon Programme Book
Can't Get Off the Island; ebook

1951 births
Living people
People from Haverfordwest